Paul Gustav Fischer (22 July 1860 – 1 May 1934) was a Danish painter.

Biography
Paul Fischer was born in Copenhagen, Denmark.
He belonged to the fourth generation of a Jewish family which originally came from Poland. 
He was the son of Philip August Fischer (1817-1907) and Gustafva Albertina Svedgren (1827–83). 
The family was upper middle class; His father had started as a painter, but later succeeded in the business of manufacturing paints and lacquers.

His formal art education lasted only a short time in his mid teens when he spent two years at the Royal Danish Academy of Art in Copenhagen. Fischer began to paint when he was still young, guided by his father. He worked  from 1878-88 at the father's factory  and exhibited regularly at Charlottenborg Spring Exhibition 1884-1902.

It was thanks to a painting he had published in Ude og Hjemme that his reputation began to evolve as he came in contact with young Danish naturalists. His earlier paintings depict city life. For this reason, he has been called "Copenhagen's painter" (Københavns maler). After a stay in Paris from 1891–1895, his colours became richer and lighter. It was not long before Fischer gained fame as a painter of cities, not just Copenhagen, but scenes from Scandinavia, Italy and Germany, reaching his zenith between 1890 and 1910.

He benefited from contemporaries in Norway and Sweden, especially Carl Larsson. Around this time, he also painted bright, sunny bathing scenes, some with nude women, and developed an interest in posters, inspired by Théophile Steinlen and Henri de Toulouse-Lautrec.

During the period when he actively painted, Danish art was dominated by Laurits Tuxen. Despite Fischer's lack of critical recognition during his lifetime, his art sold well. One major event in which he succeeded over Tuxen was when Sweden transferred the sovereignty of Norway back to the Norwegians - Fischer rather than Tuxen got the commission from the King of Norway to paint the event.

Personal life
Fischer was first married in 1886 to  Dagny Grønneberg (1867-1920) The marriage was dissolved.
He was married a second time in 1914 with concert singer Martha Vilhelmine Jensen  (1888-1966).
He died in Gentofte during 1934.

Gallery

See also
 Art of Denmark
 Les Maîtres de l'Affiche

References

External links

 Paintings by Paul Fischer

1860 births
1934 deaths
19th-century Danish painters
Danish male painters
20th-century Danish painters
Danish cityscape artists
Danish Jews
Danish people of Polish-Jewish descent
Jewish Danish artists
Jewish painters
Royal Danish Academy of Fine Arts alumni
19th-century Danish male artists
20th-century Danish male artists